Jose Filomeno de Sousa dos Santos (born 9 January 1978) is an Angolan businessman, and the son of Angola's former President José Eduardo dos Santos, who ruled the country from 1979 to 2017. He was the chairman of Fundo Soberano de Angola (FSDEA), Angola's sovereign wealth fund, was appointed to the board in 2012, and succeeded Armando Manuel as Chairman in June 2013.

Following the election of President João Lourenço, dos Santos was dismissed from his position before the end of his term. Some criticised it as a move to remove powerful figures connected to the previous president. His sister Isabel was also removed as head of the state-owned oil company Sonangol Group, which the International Monetary Fund in 2011 asked to account for a missing US$32 billion. The country derives about 60% of its revenues from oil.

Following his dismissal, Dos Santos was arrested in connection with the authorisation of a transfer of $500 million to a British bank, which froze the funds, among other charges of "criminal organization, illegal enrichment, money laundering and corruption". He was released in March 2019.

The transfer is reportedly part of negotiations for a $30 billion concessional lending facility for Angola, the money being returned to the country’s central bank.

The move to criminalise the loan negotiations with foreign lenders is seen as a means to undermine the political clout of the previous administration with the populace while at the same time shore up support for the new administration within the ruling party MPLA. The case has revealed the existence of a previously unheard of political tug-of-war in a country under political transition.

Dos Santos' father, former president José Eduardo dos Santos, lived in Barcelona.

In August 2013, dos Santos was ranked at number 26 out of the top 100 wealth fund chiefs in the world. The rankings are an annual measurement process run by The Sovereign Wealth Fund Institute and display a desire to diversify the economy of a nation highly dependent on its petroleum exports.

Dos Santos appeared on 9 December 2019 before the Supreme Court in Luanda, the capital, along with three co-defendants, who are also accused of money laundering and embezzlement, one of which is former governor of the central bank Valter Filipe da Silva.

Angolan justice sentenced dos Santos to five years in prison on 14 August 2020 for fraud, money laundering and trading in influence.

References

External links
 Priority for infrastructure: Angola fund sees bright future
 José Filomeno dos Santos interview on BBC

Angolan politicians
Living people
Alumni of the University of Westminster
21st-century Angolan people
1978 births
Jose Filomeno